Austroargiolestes is a genus of damselflies in the family Argiolestidae.
They are commonly known as Flatwings; unlike many other damselflies, at rest their wings are spread out flat.

They are medium-sized dragonflies with bronze-black colouring and pale markings. Species of Austroargiolestes are endemic to eastern Australia.

Species 
The genus Austroargiolestes includes the following species:

Austroargiolestes alpinus  - New England Flatwing
Austroargiolestes amabilis  - Flame Flatwing
Austroargiolestes aureus  - Tropical Flatwing
Austroargiolestes brookhousei  - Barrington Flatwing
Austroargiolestes calcaris  - Powdered Flatwing
Austroargiolestes christine  - Milky Flatwing
Austroargiolestes chrysoides  - Golden Flatwing
Austroargiolestes elke  - Azure Flatwing
Austroargiolestes icteromelas  - Common Flatwing
Austroargiolestes isabellae  - Sydney Flatwing

See also
 List of Odonata species of Australia

References

Calopterygoidea
Zygoptera genera
Odonata of Australia
Endemic fauna of Australia
Taxa named by Clarence Hamilton Kennedy
Insects described in 1925